Novopolotsk is a city in Vitebsk Oblast, Belarus, with a population (2008 estimate) of 107,458. Founded in 1958, it is located close to the city of Polotsk and the name literally means "New Polotsk."

Industry
Out of all the cities in the Vitebsk Oblast, Novopolotsk is the leading producer in the refining and chemical industry business. The entire city of Novopolotsk and Polotsk live and survive because of this industry.

OJSC "Naftan"

Naftan is the leading oil refinery. It was constructed in 1959. This refinery takes crude oil from the Volga Region of Russia and generates diesel, gasoline, and kerosine, along with other technological products. In addition to Naftan, Belarus built a large chemical plant, called "Polymir". This plant produces plastic and polyethylene. There are multiple products that could be produced from polyethylene, for example artificial fur.

Tourism
Novopolotsk is not very big in the tourism business. However, there are six hotels in the city available for tourists.

Sport
Novopolotsk has produced several players for Belarus national bandy team. Daniil Garnitsky is President of the Belarusian Bandy Federation.
Khimik-SKA Novopolotsk of the Belarusian Extraleague is the local pro hockey team.

Culture
There are several culture centres, music schools, of which the Novopolotsk State Musical College, art schools, and libraries in the city. There is also a museum of history and culture of Novopolotsk. The city has an a cappella music group, which won an international award.

International relations

Novopolotsk is twinned with:

 Chauffailles, France
 Dmitrovsky (Moscow), Russia
 Elektrostal, Russia
 Givors, France
 Kruševac, Serbia
 Kstovo, Russia
 Kursk, Russia
 Ludza, Latvia
 Mažeikiai, Lithuania
 Odintsovo, Russia
 Orekhovo-Zuyevo, Russia
 Ostrowiec Świętokrzyski, Poland
 Pantelej (Niš), Serbia
 Pavlovsk, Russia
 Pushkin, Russia
 Skadovsk, Ukraine
 Smiltene, Latvia
 Ventspils, Latvia

Former twin towns:
 Płock, Poland

In March 2022, the Polish city of Płock suspended its partnership with Novopolotsk as a response to Belarusian involvement in the 2022 Russian invasion of Ukraine.

Notable people
People from Novopolotsk:
Mikalai Aliokhin (born 1998), handballer
Elvin Mohhubat oglu Aliyev (born 2000), footballer
Igor Astapkovich (born 1963), hammer thrower
Dzmitry Barysaw (born 1995), footballer
Viktor Belyatsky (born 1970), weightlifter
Darya Blashko (born 1996), biathlete 
Viachaslau Bokhan (born 1996), handballer
Igor Brikun (born 1986), ice hockey goaltender
Pavel Chernook (born 1986), ice hockey player
Pavel Chernov (born 1990), ice hockey player
Vadim Devyatovskiy (born 1977), hammer thrower
Aleksandr Frantsev (born 1997), footballer
Lyudmila Gubkina (born 1973), hammer thrower
Danila Karaban (born 1996), ice hockey player
Uladzislaw Kasmynin (born 1990), footballer
Vitali Kiryushchenkov (born 1992), ice hockey forward
Alexander Kitarov (born 1987), ice hockey player
Sergei Kolosov (born 1986), ice hockey defenceman
Nikita Komarov (born 1988), ice hockey player
Dmitry Korobov (born 1989), ice hockey defenceman
Andrei Kostitsyn (born 1985), ice hockey forward
Sergei Kostitsyn (born 1987), ice hockey forward; brother of Andrei
Aleksandr Krasko (born 1972), athlete
Yuri Kurilsky (1979-2007), serial killer
Yuliy Kuznetsov (born 2003), footballer
Henadz Laptseu (born 1998), weightlifter
Aleksey Lesnichiy (born 1978), high jumper
Sergei Ostapchuk (1990-2011), ice hockey player
Sergey Punko (born 1981), paralympic swimmer
Sviatlana Sakhanenka (born 1989), cross-country skier
Alex Shabunya (born 1977), bodybuilder
Vadim Sushko (born 1986), ice hockey defenceman
Artem Teplov (born 1992), footballer
Vitaly Teterev (born 1983), chess player
Artyom Volkov (born 1985), ice hockey player
Roman Volkov (born 1987), footballer
Alexander Yeronov (born 1989), ice hockey player
Sergei Zadelenov (born 1976), ice hockey centre

See also
 FC Naftan Novopolotsk
 Novopolotsk (bandy club)

References

Cities in Belarus
Cities and towns built in the Soviet Union
Populated places established in 1958
Populated places in Vitebsk Region